Woolley Colliery is a village on the border between the Barnsley and Wakefield districts in Yorkshire, England. The village is now in South Yorkshire, while the former colliery was in the Wakefield Rural Ward in West Yorkshire.  The village is known locally as Mucky Woolley, as a tribute to its coalmining heritage and to distinguish it from the more affluent village of Woolley two miles away.

Coal mines were worked as early as 1850, and at about that time the village was established when two rows of small terrace cottages were built to accommodate miners. There are several coal seam outcrops on the hillside and coal had probably been mined in the area for many years before, but only on a small scale until railway transport began. The pit grew to become one of the largest in West Yorkshire. In 1980 it employed 1514 men underground and 428 on the surface.

The colliery began when two tunnels or drifts were dug into the Barnsley bed seam in the hillside. Vertical shafts were sunk to reach the deeper seams. In the 1960s there were three shafts in the pit yard and a fourth, for ventilation, about a mile to the east. At that time around 17,000 tons of high-quality coal were produced each week.

Arthur Scargill, later the leader of the NUM, started work at the colliery in 1953, when he was 15. The pit was among the most conservative in Yorkshire, and Scargill was often in dispute with the branch leadership.  He organised a strike in 1960 over the day on which union meetings were held, as he argued that these were deliberately being held at timed when the sections of the workforce that were inclined to militancy were unable to attend.

Miner's Strike 1984–85
During the UK miners' strike (1984-85) roughly 70 per cent of the workforce at the colliery went on strike for a year, but the NUM branch leadership remained conservative about the use of flying pickets and union funds to help strikers. There were arguments with the lodge at North Gawber Colliery on contributions to a kitchen, as it was claimed that Woolley, which was a much larger pit, was making a minimal contribution to feeding strikers. After the strike the men from North Gawber were transferred to Woolley.

Woolley Grange

The pit was closed in 1987 and the buildings were demolished in 1993. The site is now home to a private housing estate, Woolley Grange.

References

External links

A website all about the community life in Woolley Colliery village

Coal mines in West Yorkshire
Villages in South Yorkshire
Geography of the Metropolitan Borough of Barnsley
Buildings and structures in the City of Wakefield